The following list includes notable people who were born or have lived in Quincy, Illinois. For a similar list organized alphabetically by last name, see the category page People from Quincy, Illinois.

Acting and comedy

Crime

Fine arts

Journalism and writing 

 Harriet Bates (1856-1886), poet and novelist
 Ernest Hemmings, founder of the popular Hemmings Motor News magazine
 Rick Hummel, Hall of Fame baseball writer
 Thomas A. Oakley, CEO and chairman of Quincy Newspapers
 Arthur Pitney, inventor of the postage meter
 Jean Rabe, author
 James B. Stewart, author

Military 

 Thomas Scott Baldwin, US Army major during World War I; aviation pioneer and balloonist
 Albert Cashier, Union Army soldier during the Civil War
 James Dada Morgan, Union Army general during the Civil War
 Benjamin Prentiss, Union Army general during the Civil War
 Scott L. Thoele, US Army National Guard brigadier general
 Paul Tibbets, World War II pilot, Enola Gay

Music 

 Ray Burke clarinetist
 Ralph Carmichael, composer
 Micki Free, professional musician 
 Tom Goss, musician, born in Quincy
 The Graduate (members Corey Warning and Jared Wuestenberg)
 Bob Havens, jazz musician
 Charlie "Specks" McFadden, country blues singer and songwriter 
 Tony Peck, member of the rock band The Forecast

Politics 

 A. Otis Arnold, Illinois state legislator and businessman
 Thomas Awerkamp, Illinois State Senator and businessman
 Horace S. Cooley, Illinois Secretary of State
 Laura Kent Donahue, Illinois State Senator
 Stephen Arnold Douglas, youngest supreme court justice in Illinois history (27 years old); ran as a Democrat against Abraham Lincoln in the 1860 election 
 Mary Lou Kent, Illinois state legislator
 Frederick Kreismann, mayor of St. Louis
 Charles E. Lippincott, California State Senator and Illinois Auditor
 Benjamin M. Mitchell, state representative, born in Quincy
 Charles E. Morris, state assemblyman for Wisconsin
 Isaac N. Morris, state representative
 Brian Munzlinger, state representative for Missouri
 Mark A. Penick, Illinois state senators
 William Alexander Richardson, U.S. Senator
 Lillian E. Schlagenhauf, Illinois state senator and lawyer
 Onias C. Skinner, Illinois jurist and legislator
 William Rudolph Smith, attorney general of Wisconsin
 Max C. Starkloff (1858-1942), St. Louis Health Commissioner who introduced social distancing during the 1918 flu pandemic
 Art Tenhouse, Illinois state legislator
 William D. Turner, state assemblyman for Wisconsin
 John Wood, city founder and the 12th governor of Illinois

Religion 

 Edgar Johnson Goodspeed, theologian and scholar
 Etta Semple, atheist activist 
 Father Augustus Tolton, first African-American priest

Sports

References 

Quincy–Hannibal area

Quincy
Quincy